Kizhakku Africavil Sheela is a 1987 Indian Tamil-language film produced and directed by Dwarakish. A remake of the 1986 Kannada film Africadalli Sheela and inspired by the works featuring Sheena, Queen of the Jungle, the film stars Suresh, Sahila Chadha, Nizhalgal Ravi and Kanchana. It was released on 14 January 1987.

Plot 

A doctor goes deep into the dark continent of Africa with his wife to help tribals. The couple are killed before that can be done, and their daughter is raised by apes, growing up to be Sheela. The doctor's father sends an expedition to search for his son. Unknown to him, the members of this expedition have other goals. How one of the expedition's members checkmates their moves and does the rescue forms the rest of the plot.

Cast 
 Nizhalgal Ravi
 Sahila Chadha
 Suresh

Production 
Kizhakku Africavil Sheela is a remake of the 1986 Kannada film Africadalli Sheela, and was also inspired by the works featuring Sheena, Queen of the Jungle. The film was shot predominantly in Zimbabwe. Directed by Dwarakish, it was also produced by him under his banner Dwarakish Chitra. Sahila Chadha, who starred as the eponymous Sheela in Kannada, reprised her role in the remake.

Soundtrack 
The soundtrack was composed by Bappi Lahiri and lyrics written by Vaali.

Release and reception 
Kizhakku Africavil Sheela was released on 14 January 1987. In a review dated 6 February 1987, The Indian Express felt the film largely resembled the "listless" television series Appu Aur Pappu as it was "stilted and trashy" like the dubbed Telugu action films that were common in that era. The reviewer criticised the characterisation of the villains, but praised the "catchy disco rhythms" composed by Bappi Lahiri, and Disco Shanti's "raw appeal". Jayamanmadhan of Kalki panned the film, saying it might have worked better in a language other than Tamil.

References

External links 
 

1980s Tamil-language films
Films directed by Dwarakish
Films scored by Bappi Lahiri
Films set in jungles
Films shot in Zimbabwe
Tamil remakes of Kannada films